NHL Network is an American sports-oriented cable and satellite television network that is a joint venture between the National Hockey League (which owns a controlling 84.4% interest) and NBCUniversal (which owns the remaining 15.6%). Dedicated to ice hockey, the network features live game telecasts from the NHL and other professional and collegiate hockey leagues, as well as NHL-related content including analysis programs, specials and documentaries.

History
Launched on October 1, 2007, the NHL Network was developed out of a joint venture between the NHL and cable provider Comcast, as part of a broadcast rights agreement that resulted in the NBC Sports Network (then known as Outdoor Life Network) acquiring partial cable television rights to regular season, and Stanley Cup playoff and finals games from the National Hockey League. It became the third sports-oriented cable network devoted to programming from and controlled by one of the Major professional sports leagues in the United States and Canada, following the National Basketball Association-owned NBA TV (which launched in March 1999) and the National Football League-owned NFL Network (which launched in November 2003); Major League Baseball would launch its own sports channel, MLB Network, on January 1, 2009.

On June 1, 2015, The Globe and Mail columnist David Shoalts reported that NHL Network in Canada would cease operations on September 1, 2015; national media rights to the NHL in Canada had been acquired by Rogers Communications beginning in the 2014–15 season, and the Bell Media employees who managed the network's Canadian arm on behalf of the NHL were laid off that July.

In August 2015, it was announced that the NHL had reached a six-year deal with Major League Baseball Advanced Media (MLBAM) to take over the management of the NHL's digital properties, as well as NHL Network. Operations and production of NHL Network's programming was shifted from Toronto to the Secaucus, New Jersey facilities of MLB Network. There has been minor talent sharing between the networks, and MLB Network cross-promoted an NHL Stadium Series game at Coors Field by building a scale hockey rink in its Studio 42 (which itself is designed to resemble a scaled baseball field). For much of the 2015–16 season, NHL Network studio programs originated from redecorated versions of MLB Network's existing studio sets (enabled by a lack of major overlap between the two leagues' regular seasons). In April 2016, coinciding with the start of the playoffs, NHL Network introduced its own 1,200 square-foot set, "The Rink".

The network will continue to operate under the league's new television contract consortium of ESPN and Turner Sports beginning with the 2021–22 season (which excludes NBCUniversal). NHL Network will continue to nationally air selected games not broadcast by either ESPN or Turner.

SiriusXM NHL Network Radio launched in 2013.

Carriage agreements
Comcast, owners of the league's former cable partner NBCSN, is also the largest cable television provider in the United States. The company was contractually obligated to carry NHL Network on its systems by the summer of 2007 at the latest, so it would be available in time for the 2007–08 NHL season. Both Comcast and the NHL had an option to terminate their contract after the 2006–07 season, which would have voided Comcast's obligation to launch a U.S. version of NHL Network, but opted to proceed with the launch.

Since its official launch in the United States, the NHL Network announced on October 8, 2007 that it would begin being carried that month on Cablevision, Charter, Cox Communications, DirecTV, Dish Network, Xfinity and Time Warner Cable through carriage agreements that were struck with each of the providers.  DirecTV has aired NHL Network on channel 215 since October 31, 2007.

NHL.com announced on January 12, 2009 that AT&T U-verse would begin carrying the channel. This was followed on June 2, 2009 with the announcement that NHL Network and Comcast had reached an agreement to carry the channel on the provider's Digital Classic Tier, which increased subscribership of the channel from the then-estimated two million subscribers in its placement on the "Sports Entertainment" tier to over 10 million on its Digital Classic package.

In 2016, Sling TV became the first over-the-top media service to offer NHL Network.

Carriage disputes
In 2011, AT&T U-verse refused to carry NHL Network over a planned increase in retransmission payments.

Programming

Hockey telecasts
The NHL Network originally shared some programming with its now-defunct sister network in Canada, with the main differences in programming between the two networks being the carriage of domestically targeted commercials and live game telecasts. For those live NHL games aired throughout the season, they are primarily simulcasts of feeds from one of the team's regional rightsholders or Canadian rightsholder Sportsnet, including CBC-aired Hockey Night in Canada coverage on Saturday evenings. In 2021, the network introduced its first original broadcasts, the NHL Network Showcase, which is modeled after MLB Network's MLB Network Showcase, and air on weekend afternoons. 

Until the 2021–22 season, NHL Network also carried selected first round games during the Stanley Cup Playoffs.

NHL Network has also aired other hockey leagues and events, such as the American Hockey League, college hockey, and the IIHF World Junior Championship.

Other programs

 NHL Tonight (formerly NHL on the Fly) – NHL Network's signature show, which covers on- and off-ice NHL news with highlights, interviews and analysis.
 NHL Now – A program that features interviews with NHL players and insight from NHL insiders. The program also shows viewers voicing their opinions from social media on noteworthy news from the day.
 Hockey Central at Noon - Simulcast of CJCL/Toronto's NHL Sportsnet-produced .
 Top 10 – A countdown program focusing on hockey-related topics, from great performances to memorable moments.
 Frozen in Time – A retrospective program that features a look back at the greatest moments in the NHL from players, teams, and special events.
 Classic Series – A collection of highlights from a past Stanley Cup Playoff series.
 Vintage Games – NHL Network airs archived broadcasts of past NHL games in their entirety from the game's original broadcaster.
 Pioneers – A profile series in which NHL legends discuss their groundbreaking careers.
 NHL Movie Night/NHL Flicks – A movie program that airs hockey-related theatrical films.
 NHL Network also has the right to air various Stanley Cup films from the winning teams from different years.
 NHL Network Ice Time - A series designed for young people on the sport of hockey featuring instructions on the game and interviews with NHL Players and is hosted by Jackie Redmond.

On-air staff
Current on-air talent includes:

 Bruce Boudreau - studio analyst
 Scott Braun - studio host
 Fran Charles - studio host
 Kendall Coyne Schofield - studio analyst
 Ken Daneyko - studio analyst
 Elliotte Friedman - network insider
 Lauren Gardner - studio host and reporter
 Stu Grimson - studio analyst 
 Scott Hartnell - studio analyst
 Jamie Hersch - studio host
 Billy Jaffe - studio analyst
 Mike Johnson - studio analyst
 Mike Kelly - network insider
 Steve Konroyd - studio analyst
 Brian Lawton - studio analyst 
 Bill Lindsay - studio analyst
 Barry Melrose - studio analyst
 Darren Pang - studio analyst
 Mark Parrish - studio analyst
 Jackie Redmond - studio host
 Dave Reid - studio analyst
 Mike Rupp - studio analyst
 Siera Santos - studio host
 Scott Stevens - studio analyst
 Erika Wachter - studio host
 Kevin Weekes - studio analyst

References

External links
 NHL Network official website

National Hockey League on television
NHL on NBC
Joint ventures
Television channels and stations established in 2007
English-language television stations in the United States
Sports television networks in the United States
NBCUniversal networks
Secaucus, New Jersey